Bolívar Municipality is a municipality in Falcón State, Venezuela.

Name
The municipality is one of several in Venezuela named "Bolívar Municipality" in honour of Venezuelan independence hero Simón Bolívar.

Municipalities of Falcón